Elachista elsaella is a moth of the family Elachistidae that is endemic to  Sweden.

Adults are on wing from May to August.

References

elsaella
Moths described in 1988
Endemic fauna of Sweden
Moths of Europe